The Short Mayo Composite was a piggy-back long-range seaplane/flying boat combination produced by Short Brothers to provide a reliable long-range air transport service to North America and, potentially, to other distant places in the British Empire and the Commonwealth.

Development
Short Brothers had built the Empire flying boats which were capable of operating long range routes across the British Empire but could only attempt the trans-Atlantic route by replacing passenger and mail-carrying space with extra fuel.

It was known that aircraft could maintain flight with a greater payload than that possible during takeoff. Major Robert H. Mayo, the Technical General Manager at Imperial Airways, proposed mounting a small, long-range seaplane on top of a larger carrier aircraft, using the combined power of both to bring the smaller aircraft to operational height, at which time the two aircraft would separate, the carrier aircraft returning to base while the other flew on to its destination. The British Air Ministry issued Specification "13/33" to cover this project.

Design
The Short-Mayo composite project, co-designed by Mayo and Shorts chief designer Arthur Gouge, comprised the Short S.21 Maia,  (G-ADHK) which was a variant of the Short "C-Class" Empire flying-boat fitted with a trestle or pylon on the top of the fuselage to support the Short S.20 Mercury(G-ADHJ).

Like the Empire boats, Maia could be equipped to carry 18 passengers. Maia first flew (without Mercury) on 27 July 1937, piloted by Shorts' Chief Test Pilot, John Lankester Parker.

The upper component, Mercury, was a twin-float, four-engine seaplane crewed by a single pilot and a navigator, who sat in tandem in an enclosed cockpit. Flight controls, except for elevator and rudder trim tabs, were locked in neutral until separation. Mercury's first flight, also piloted by Parker, was on 5 September 1937.

The mechanism that held the two aircraft together allowed for a small degree of movement. Lights indicated when the upper component was in fore-aft balance so trim could be adjusted prior to release. The pilots could then release their respective locks. The design was such that at separation Maia would tend to drop while Mercury would climb.

Operations

The first successful in-flight separation was carried out from the Shorts works at Borstal, near Rochester, Medway, on 6 February 1938, Maia piloted by Parker and Mercury by Harold Piper. Maia, flown by Captain A.S. Wilcockson, took off from Southampton carrying Mercury piloted by Captain Don Bennett. As well as Mercury, the launch aircraft Maia was also carrying 10 passengers and luggage. Mercury separated from her carrier at 8 pm to continue what was to become the first commercial  non-stop East-to-West transatlantic flight by a heavier-than-air machine.

The Maia-Mercury composite continued in use with Imperial Airways, including Mercury flying to Alexandria, Egypt, in December 1938.

Only one example of the Short-Mayo composite was built, the S.21 Maia with the registration G-ADHK and the S.20 Mercury G-ADHJ. The development of a more powerful and longer-range Empire boat (the Short S.26), the increase in allowable all-up weights with the standard "C-Class", the further development of in-flight refuelling and the outbreak of the Second World War combined to render the approach obsolete. Maia was destroyed in Poole Harbour by German bombers on 11 May 1941. Mercury was flown to Felixstowe for use by 320 (Netherlands) Squadron RAF a unit of the Royal Air Force formed from the personnel of the Royal Netherlands Naval Air Service. This squadron was based at the time at RAF Pembroke Dock. When this squadron was re-equipped with Lockheed Hudsons, Mercury was returned to Shorts at Rochester on 9 August 1941 and broken up so that its aluminium could be recycled for use in the war effort.

Legacy
On the Tay Embankment close to the  there is a bronze plaque attached to the seawall. This commemorates the world record long-distance seaplane flight, at a location where the estuary and hills behind the take-off waters are seen. The plaque shows in raised relief the two aircraft still joined but reaching the altitude at which they would have separated. The plaque also contains wording including: - ″Commemoration of the 1938 flight of Captain Bennett from the Tay Estuary to South West Africa... The world record long-distance flight by a seaplane was achieved by the aircraft "Mercury", the upper component of the Short Mayo... The two experimental planes ...were built by Short Brothers for Imperial Airways and designed to carry mail long distances without refueling... This tribute to the epic flight by Captain D.C.T. Bennett and First Officer Ian Harvey was unveiled by Captain Bennett's wife Mrs Ly Bennett and Lord Provost Mervyn Rollo on 4 October 1997.″

The concept also had an unusual legacy, since in 1976 NASA needed to transport the Space Shuttle between the Kennedy Space Center and Edwards Air Force Base between each mission, and to get the craft airborne for gliding tests. A NASA engineer remembered the Mayo Composite, and NASA modified a second-hand Boeing 747 as the carrier aircraft accordingly.

Operators

 Imperial Airways
 Royal Air Force
 No. 320 Squadron RAF

Specifications (S.20 Mercury)

Specifications (S.21 Maia)

 See also 

Notes
Notes

Citations

References

Composite Aircraft Flight 1935
The Great Experiment Flight 1937

External links

 1935 article describing the proposed Short-Mayo Composite
 "Flying Boat Launches Sea Mail Plane in Air" Popular Mechanics'', April 1935, article with drawing explaining concept of purposed Short Mayo Composition.
 Aero Stories
 Contemporary article in Time magazine, 14 February 1938
 Irish Inland Waterway News, Winter 2001
 Imperial Airways history
 Image of the Maia/Mercury at www.historyofaircargo.com
 Download link for "The Guild of Aircraft Pilots and Navigators of London 1929 - 2004"
 

Articles containing video clips
1930s British airliners
Composite aircraft
Eight-engined tractor aircraft
Parasite aircraft
Flying boats
Mayo Composite
Aircraft first flown in 1937
Floatplanes
Four-engined piston aircraft